I Am a Camera is a 1951 Broadway play by John Van Druten adapted from Christopher Isherwood's 1939 novel Goodbye to Berlin, which is part of The Berlin Stories. The title is a quotation taken from the novel's first page: "I am a camera with its shutter open, quite passive, recording, not thinking." The original production was staged by John Van Druten, with scenic and lighting design by Boris Aronson and costumes by Ellen Goldsborough. It opened at the Empire Theatre in New York City on November 28, 1951 and ran for 214 performances before closing on July 12, 1952.

The production was a critically acclaimed success for both Julie Harris as the insouciant Sally Bowles, winning her the first of five Tony Awards of her career for Best Leading Actress in a play, and for Marian Winters, who won both the Theatre World Award and Tony Award for Featured Actress in a Play. The play also won for John Van Druten the New York Drama Critics' Circle for Best American Play (1952). It also earned the famous review by Walter Kerr, "Me no Leica".

Original Broadway Cast (1951)
Christopher Isherwood – William Prince
Fraulein Schneider – Olga Fabian
Fritz Wendel – Martin Brooks
Sally Bowles – Julie Harris
Natalia Landauer – Marian Winters
Clive Mortimer – Edward Andrews
Mrs. Watson-Courtneidge – Catherine Willard

Adaptations
 Film – I Am a Camera (1955) – screenplay by John Collier, music by Malcolm Arnold, starring Julie Harris, Laurence Harvey, and Shelley Winters.
 Broadway Musical – Cabaret (1966) – directed by Hal Prince, book by Joe Masteroff, music by John Kander, lyrics by Fred Ebb, starring Jill Haworth, Bert Convy, Lotte Lenya, Jack Gilford, and Joel Grey. 
 Film Musical – Cabaret (1972) – directed by Bob Fosse, music by John Kander, lyrics by Fred Ebb, starring Liza Minnelli, Joel Grey, and Michael York.

References

External links

 

1951 plays
Broadway plays
Plays based on novels
Berlin in fiction
Plays by John Van Druten
Works set in cabarets
Plays about abortion